Gastrinodes is a genus of moths in the family Geometridae erected by William Warren in 1898. Its species occur in Australia. Its type species is G. bitaeniaria, originally described as Geometra bitaeniaria.

Species
Gastrinodes argoplaca (Le Guillou, 1841)
Gastrinodes bitaeniaria (Meyrick, 1892)

References

Boarmiini
Moths of Australia
Taxa named by William Warren (entomologist)
Moth genera